Kenwood Historic District may refer to:

in the United States
(by state)
 Kenwood Historic District (St. Petersburg, Florida), listed on the NRHP in Florida
Hyde Park-Kenwood Historic District, Chicago, Illinois, listed on the NRHP in South Side of Chicago, Illinois
Kenwood District, the southern Kenwood neighborhood designated as a Chicago Landmark District, in Illinois
North Kenwood District, the northern Kenwood neighborhood designated as a Chicago Landmark District, in Illinois
Kenwood Historic District (Enid, Oklahoma), NRHP-listed
Kenwood Park-Prospect Hill Historic District, Milwaukee, Wisconsin, listed on the NRHP in Milwaukee, Wisconsin